The Mishor Rotem Power Station is a former oil shale-fired power station and current natural gas-fired power station in Mishor Rotem, Israel. It is operated by OPC Rotem, a subsidiary of the Israel Corporation (80%) and Veolia Environnement (20%).

Oil shale-fired power plant 
Between 1982 and 1986, the PAMA, a subsidiary of Israel Electric Corporation, established and operated a  pilot plant. After a R&D program was carried out and funded by PAMA and the Israel Ministry of National Infrastructures with an investment of approximately $30 million, the  demonstration plant was completed in 1989. The generated power was sold to the Israel Electric Corporation (IEC), and low-pressure steam was supplied to an adjacent industrial complex. After 2000, the power station was operated by Rotem Amfert Negev, a subsidiary of Israel Chemicals, an Israel Corporation company.

The power station required approximately half a million tons of oil shale annually, which was transported from a nearby open-pit mine. A large part of the ash generated in the process was used in products such as cat litter. Most of the ash product was distributed in Europe under the commercial name Alganite.

OPC Rotem natural gas power plant
OPC Rotem, a joint venture of IC Power, a subsidiary of the Israel Corporation, and Dalkia Israel Ltd., a subsidiary of Veolia Environnement, built a 440 MW single-shaft combined cycle natural gas-fired power plant at the site. Constructed by Daewoo with turbines and generators from Mitsubishi Heavy Industries, it came on-line in the summer of 2013.

As of 2020, OPC is seeking approval from the national planning authorities for the addition of a 530MW generation unit to the site.

See also 
 Oil shale in Israel

References 

Natural gas-fired power stations in Israel
Oil shale-fired power stations in Israel